Yank Sing is a dim sum with locations in the Rincon Center (opened in 1999) with a second location on Stevenson Street in the Financial District, San Francisco.

The original location open at Broadway and Powell Street, Chinatown, San Francisco in 1958 by Alice Chan. Vera Chan-Waller, her granddaughter, and husband Nathan Waller are the current owners. Her father Henry dropped out of medical school weeks shy of completion when Alice got sick and needed the help.

Chef and restaurateur Cecilia Chiang lunched at the Chinatown location everyday and Dianne Feinstein was a frequent customer at their Battery Street location.  Woody Allen filmed part of his 1972 movie Play It Again, Sam at the Broadway location.  The James Beard Foundation named them an American Classic in 2009.  The restaurant was featured on Season 1, Episode 2 of The Best Thing I Ever Ate.

Labor problems
In the summer of 2013, 280 employees followed the advice of the Chinese Progressive Assn. and filed labor violation complaints looking for better working conditions and wages with the help of the Asian Law Caucus. Henry Chan and his wife Judy did not fight the charges.

The Chans gave the employees raises and paid vacations and health benefits. They also gave more than 280 former and current employees $4 million in back wages.

References

Chinese restaurants in California
Financial District, San Francisco
James Beard Foundation Award winners
Restaurants in San Francisco